Shamaryata is a rural locality (a village) in Osintsevskoye Rural Settlement, Kishertsky District, Perm Krai, Russia. The population was 1 as of 2010.

Geography 
Shamaryata is located 35 km east of Ust-Kishert (the district's administrative centre) by road. Koshelevo is the nearest rural locality.

References 

Rural localities in Kishertsky District